Ondru Engal Jaathiye..! is a 1987 Indian Tamil-language film co-written and directed by Ramarajan. The film stars him and Nishanthi. It was released on 31 July 1987.

Plot

Cast 
 Ramarajan
 Nishanthi
 Mohankumar
 Rasi
 Senthil
 S. S. Chandran
 Vinu Chakravarthy
 Ravichandran
 Sulakshana

Production 
Ramarajan, besides directing Ondru Engal Jaathiye..!, also wrote the screenplay from a story by Raghavan Thambi, who also wrote the dialogues.

Soundtrack 
The music was composed by Gangai Amaran.

Release and reception 
Ondru Engal Jaathiye..! was released on 31 July 1987, and distributed by Moogambikai Cine Distributors. V. S. Thomas of The Indian Express wrote, "Rehashing old plots with added frills has become a trend and [Ondru Engal Jaathiye] is another example of this. However as the artistes are new and the treatment fresh it does not disappoint the audience though old-timers may consider it old wine in a new bottle". Jeyamanmadhan of Kalki wrote that Ramarajan multitasking was not the path to success, and noted that the film looked like the reverse of Padagotti (1964).

References

External links 
 

1980s Tamil-language films
Films directed by Ramarajan
Films scored by Gangai Amaran